Edward Marshall (October 6, 1908 – May 26, 1984) was an American rower. He competed in the men's coxed four event at the 1932 Summer Olympics.

References

External links
 

1908 births
1984 deaths
American male rowers
Olympic rowers of the United States
Rowers at the 1932 Summer Olympics
Rowers from Philadelphia